Burning Cane is a 2019 American drama film written and directed by Phillip Youmans in his feature directorial debut. The film stars Wendell Pierce, Karen Kaia Livers, Dominique McClellan and Braelyn Kelly. Set in rural Louisiana, we follow Helen Wayne, a deeply religious mother, as she tries to mend both her self-destructive son and the alcoholic pastor of her church. The film was released on October 25, 2019, by Array Releasing.

Cast
Wendell Pierce as Reverend Tillman
Karen Kaia Livers as Helen Wayne
Dominique McClellan as Daniel Wayne
Braelyn Kelly as Jeremiah Wayne

Release
The film premiered at the Tribeca Film Festival on April 25, 2019. On September 5, 2019, Array Releasing acquired distribution rights to the film. The film was released theatrically on October 25, 2019, by Array Releasing. Burning Cane premiered on Netflix November 6, 2019.

Reception
Burning Cane received generally positive reviews from film critics. Review aggregation website Rotten Tomatoes gives it  approval rating, based on reviews from  critics. The site's critical consensus states: "Burning Cane is a compelling look at weighty themes -- and a remarkably assured debut from an impressively talented young filmmaker." Metacritic gives the film a rating of 74 out of 100, based on reviews from 11 critics, indicating "generally favorable reviews". The film won three awards at Tribeca Film Festival: "Founder Award for Best Narrative Feature", "Best Actor", and "Best Cinematography."

See also
List of African American films of the 2010s

References

External links
 

2019 films
2019 drama films
American drama films
American filmmakers
African-American drama films
Films set in Louisiana
2010s English-language films
2010s American films